In molecular biology, the protein domain selenoprotein P (SelP) is the only known eukaryotic selenoprotein that contains multiple selenocysteine (Sec) residues. It is a secreted glycoprotein, often found in the plasma. Its precise function remains to be elucidated; however, it is thought to have antioxidant properties. This particular protein contains two domains: the C terminal and N terminal domain. The N-terminal domain is larger than the C terminal and the N-terminal is thought to be glycosylated.

Function
SelP may have antioxidant properties. It can attach to epithelial cells, and may protect vascular endothelial cells against peroxynitrite toxicity. The high selenium content of SelP suggests that it may be involved in selenium intercellular transport or storage. The promoter structure of bovine SelP suggests that it may be involved in countering heavy metal intoxication, and may also have a developmental function.

Structure
The N-terminal region always contains one Sec residue, and this is separated from the C-terminal region (9-16 Sec residues) by a histidine-rich sequence. The large number of Sec residues in the C-terminal portion of SelP suggests that it may be involved in selenium transport or storage. However, it is also possible that this region has a redox function.

N terminal domain

Function
N-terminal domain allows conservation of whole body selenium
and appears to supply selenium to the kidney

Structure
The structure of the N-terminal domain is larger and contains less Selenium. However it is thought to be heavily glycosylated

C terminal domain

Function
The function of the C-terminal domain is known to be vital for maintaining levels of  selenium in brain and testis but not for the maintenance
of whole body selenium. Brain and testis tissue.

Structure
The C-terminal domain is smaller in size but far more rich in selenium.

Protein interactions
Binds to heparin in a pH-dependent manner

References

Protein families